The China Earthquake Administration (CEA), is mandated by the Law of the People's Republic of China on Protecting Against and Mitigating Earthquake Disasters of PRC to enforce the earthquake administration in the nation under the administration of State Council of the People's Republic of China.

Some English text use the name Chinese Seismic Bureau (CSB).  In older text, it was also referred to by its former name, National Earthquake Bureau (NEB) or National Seismic Bureau (NSB).

Bureaus
CEA presently has nine bureaus, two of which directly under the control of the Chinese Communist Party (CCP).

 Administrative Office and Office of Policy Research
 Bureau of Development and Finance
 Bureau of Monitoring and Prediction
 Bureau of Earthquake Damage Protection
 Bureau of Earthquake Emergency Response and Relief
 Bureau of Personnel, Education, Science and Technology and Bureau of International Cooperation
 (Chinese Communist) Party Committee of Direct Subordinate Institutions
 Group of (CCP) Discipline and Surveillance, a Delegation of the Central Committee of Discipline and Surveillance (of the Chinese Communist Party) and Bureau of Surveillance
 Office of Welfare of Retired Personnel and Retired (CCP) Party Officials

Establishment of the CEA 
As a country stricken by two of the world's ten most fatal earthquakes before the creation of CEA, China's first seismic monitoring stations were set up under the Chinese Academy of Sciences.  A national Earthquake Affairs Officewas created under joint administration of the National Science and Technology Commission and Chinese Academy of Sciences after the 1966 Xingtai earthquake.  A Central Task Force of Earthquakes under the Central Committee of the Chinese Communist Party was created the day after a M7.4 earthquake struck Bohai Bay on July 18, 1969.

In 1971, the State Council decided to create the National Earthquake Bureau (CNEB), predecessor to CEA, to replace the "Central Task Force".  The State Council initially delegated administration of the CNEB to the Chinese Academy of Sciences.  CNEB became directly administrated by the State Councile in 1975.

Following the recommendation from the CNEB, each province, autonomous regions and centrally administrated municipalities in PRC has established its own earthquake bureau since 1977.  In 1985, these local bureaus were placed under dual leadership of the local government and the national bureau.

CNEB was renamed CEA in 1998.

See also
Tectonic summary of Qinghai Province

References

External links
  Official CEA Web site.

Emergency management in China
Government agencies of China
Seismological observatories, organisations and projects
State Council of the People's Republic of China